Cowboys is a 2020 American drama film written and directed by Anna Kerrigan. It stars Steve Zahn, Jillian Bell, Sasha Knight and Ann Dowd.

It had its world premiere at Outfest on August 22, 2020, and was released on February 12, 2021, by Samuel Goldwyn Films.

Cast
 Steve Zahn as Troy
 Jillian Bell as Sally
 Sasha Knight as Joe
 Ann Dowd as Detective Faith Erickson
 Gary Farmer as Robert Spottedbird
 Chris Coy as Jerry
 A.J. Slaght as Stevie
 Bob Stephenson as Sheriff George Jenkins
 John Beasley as Ben the Friendly Ranger
 John Reynolds as Grover

Plot

Trans boy Joe's troubled but well-intentioned father Troy takes off with him into the Montana wilderness, pursued by police, after his wife Sally, from whom he has recently separated, refuses to let Joe live as his authentic self.

Production
In an interview with PopMatters, Kerrigan said that there had never been any doubt about casting a non-binary or transgender actor to portray the role of Joe, and that after finding newcomer Sasha Knight, "it was obvious that he was our Joe."

Release
Cowboys  had its world premiere at the LGBTQ-oriented film festival Outfest on August 22, 2020, and shortly thereafter Samuel Goldwyn Films acquired distribution rights for it. The film had originally been set to have its world premiere at the Tribeca Film Festival in April 2020, however, due to the COVID-19 pandemic, the festival was cancelled. It was eventually released on February 12, 2021.

Critical response
The site's critical consensus reads, "Cowboys explores emotionally charged themes with a steady hand, highlighting the humanity of its characters in a story of fraught family dynamics and gender identity."

References

External links
 
 
 

2020 drama films
2020 films
2020 LGBT-related films
American drama films
LGBT-related drama films
Transgender-related films
Samuel Goldwyn Films films
American LGBT-related films
Films set in Montana
Films shot in Montana
2020s English-language films
2020s American films
Films about trans men